OIS ORBexpress is a commercial, object request broker (ORB) product from Objective Interface Systems for the Ada, C++, C#, and Java programming languages.

ORBexpress features tools for developing and debugging distributed, real-time applications.

1998 software
Object request broker